Mary Lee Robb Cline (February 15, 1926, – August 28, 2006) was a radio actress during the 1940s and 1950s. Her name is sometimes seen as Marylee Robb.

Early life
Robb was born in Streator, Illinois, and lived much of her early life in Chicago. Her father, Alex S. Robb, was an executive at NBC.

In 1939 her family moved to Los Angeles, California, where she attended University High School and University of California, Los Angeles.

Career
Robb made her radio debut in 1947 on the Lum and Abner program. She also appeared on The Penny Singleton Show.

As Mary Lee Robb, she is best known for playing Marjorie, Gildersleeve's niece, on The Great Gildersleeve, replacing Louise Erickson in that role. A small role in a 1948 episode of that program led to the full-time role of Marjorie, which she played until 1954.

Personal life
Robb's first marriage, to Charles Vance Smith, ended in divorce. Robb left acting in the mid-1950s in order to raise their son, Robb Smith, and daughter Alexandra.

In 1983 she married William H. Cline, who died in 2005.

A year later, she died of heart failure at Desert Regional Medical Center in Palm Springs, California. Mary Lee Robb was survived by her daughter Alexandra, son Robb, son-in-law Alex, and daughter-in-law Melissa. Robb also left behind her two grandchildren, Robbyn and Tyler.

References
 

1926 births
2006 deaths
American radio actresses
20th-century American actresses
University of California, Los Angeles alumni
University High School (Los Angeles) alumni
People from Streator, Illinois
Burials at Pacific View Memorial Park
21st-century American women